Everybody in Our Family  is a 2012 Romanian psychological thriller drama directed by  Radu Jude.

Synopsis

Marius is a divorced man in his late thirties. His five-year-old daughter lives with her mother, her mother's new husband and parents, much to Marius' frustration. Every little thing Marius (Șerban Pavlu) does is meant to serve one purpose only: to make the intended trip to the seaside with his daughter Sofia come true. Little by little, and despite his attempts to face ever mounting troubles, Marius loses battle after battle—with his parents, his former mother-in-law, his ex-wife Otilia (Mihaela Sîrbu), and her new partner.

Director Radu Jude (The Happiest Girl in the World, A Film for Friends) expands on the theme explored in his 2007 short Alexandra in this bitterly ironic and intelligently choreographed drama. Marius’ erratic movements beautifully illustrate his state of confusion. He turns from victim to aggressor, and the scene of this sudden transition displays both raw energy and directorial mastery. Everything happens in the name of the family, which is exactly the thing that seems to matter the least to everybody.

Cast

 Șerban Pavlu as Marius Vizureanu
 Sofia Nicolaescu as Sofia Vizureanu
 Mihaela Sîrbu as Otilia
 Gabriel Spahiu as Aurel
 Tamara Buciuceanu-Botez as Coca
 Stela Popescu as Mrs. Vizureanu
 Alexandru Arșinel as Mr. Vizureanu
 Adina Cristescu as pharmacist #1
 Andreea Boșneag as pharmacist #2
 Silviu Mircescu as bodyguard
 Coca Bloos (voice) as neighbour

Awards
2012 Sarajevo Film Festival
The Heart of Sarajevo Award for Best Film
2012 CinEast
Grand Prix CinEast 2012
2012 Anonimul film festival
 Grand prix award for best feature film

References

External links
 
 

2010s Romanian-language films
2012 films
Romanian thriller films
Heart of Sarajevo Award for Best Film winners
Films directed by Radu Jude
Films about divorce